Loché is a community in the Panabá Municipality, Yucatan, Mexico. The name Loché is of Mayan origin.
The town of Cenote mentioned in early Spanish records is sometimes identified with it.

References

Populated places in Yucatán